Mattia Del Favero (born 5 June 1998) is an Italian professional footballer who plays as a goalkeeper for  club Pro Patria on loan from Juventus.

Club career
He first appeared on the bench for Juventus as the third goalkeeper on 30 May 2015 in a game against Verona. He appeared several more times on the bench during the 2016–17 and 2017–18 seasons, but did not make any game appearances for the squad.

He made his Serie C debut for Juventus U23 on 16 September 2018 in a game against Alessandria.

On 22 July 2019, he joined Serie C club Piacenza on loan.

On 10 September 2020 he joined Pescara on loan.

On 6 August 2021, he joined Cosenza on loan. Del Favero, due to an injury at his shoulder did not play any match.

On 11 January 2022, Juventus announced the termination of the loan one year early.

On 7 July 2022, he was loaned to Pro Patria.

International career
He made his debut with the Italy U21 on 3 September 2020, in a friendly match won 2–1 against Slovenia.

Honours
Juventus
 Supercoppa Italiana: 2018

Career statistics

References

External links
 

1998 births
Footballers from Florence
Living people
Italian footballers
Italy youth international footballers
Association football goalkeepers
Juventus F.C. players
Juventus Next Gen players
Piacenza Calcio 1919 players
Delfino Pescara 1936 players
Cosenza Calcio players
Aurora Pro Patria 1919 players
Serie C players